Ipil, officially the Municipality of Ipil (Chavacano: Municipalidad de Ipil), is a 1st class municipality and capital of the province of Zamboanga Sibugay, Philippines. According to the 2020 census, it has a population of 89,401 people. Ipil is the most populous municipality of Zamboanga Sibugay, and  the second most populous in Region IX after Sindangan.

Ipil Airport is located at Barangay Sanito, along the Pan Philippine Highway, and it is the only airport in Zamboanga Sibugay.

History
Ipil used to be known as Sanito, a place under barrio Bacalan under the Municipality of Kabasalan. It was a swampy area and a docking spot for pioneering Ilocanos who settled in the upper areas of Titay. Ipil was a jumping point for their lantsa sailing to Zamboanga City. The first mayor of Ipil was Gregorio Dar, an Ilocano who came from Titay. The Dar Family were the second batch of Ilocanos who settled upon the invitation of Mariano Families who are among the first batch of Ilocanos from Luzon. When Sanito became a Town in 1949, its name was changed to Ipil, as there were many Ipil trees found within the said locale.

Early Ilocano routes
The first Ilocanos used Ipil as the nearest jump point in connecting Titay with Zamboanga City. They would walk via Lumbia then to Longilog then Gabo reaching Mayabang their original settlement. It was this route that they do not have to cross the rivers as it is uphill. It was the Ilocanos who first set foot on these areas.

Ipil massacre

On the morning of April 3, 1995, Ipil was attacked by approximately 200 heavily armed Abu Sayyaf militants who fired upon residents, strafed civilian homes, plundered banks, took up to 30 hostages and then burned the centre of the town to the ground.

The militants allegedly arrived in the town by boat and bus, and a number of them had been dressed in military fatigues

The town's Chief of Police was reportedly killed in the attack and close to a billion pesos were looted from eight commercial banks. Army commandos pursued some rebel gunmen in nearby mountains while officials said that the rebels were looting farms and seizing civilians as "human shields" as they fled the town of about 40 rebels, who may have taken hostages, were cornered in a school compound west of Ipil on April 6 when an elite army unit attacked. In the fighting that followed, the television station GMA reported, 11 civilians were killed.

Geography
Ipil is located three hours from the key cities in the region (Dipolog, Pagadian and Zamboanga City).

Climate

Barangays

Ipil is subdivided into 28 barangays.

Demographics

Economy

Government

List of former chief executives
Merjuar
Generoso Sucgang
Col Escalona
Andres P. Olegario (1972 – 1986)
Henry de Villa (1986 – 1988)
José Fontanoza (1988 – 1992)
Francisco Q. Pontanar (1992 – 1998)
Rey Andre C. Olegario (1998 – 2007)
Eldwin M. Alibutdan (2007 – 2016)
Anamel C. Olegario (2016 – present)

Healthcare
Zamboanga Sibugay Provincial Hospital
Dr. Henry De Villa Memorial Hospital
Dr. M. Simon Hospital
Ipil Doctors Hospital

Media

Radio stations

AM
DXUZ 1035 Radyo Lipay (Universidad de Zamboanga)

FM
88.7 Radyo Bisdak (Times Broadcasting Network Corporation)
92.7 The Edge Radio (United Christian Broadcasters)
94.3 Infinite Radio (St. Jude Thaddeus Institute of Technology)
95.3 Radyo Natin (Manila Broadcasting Company/Radyo Natin Network)
96.5 DABIG C Radio (Prime Broadcasting Network)
99.3 FMR Zamboanga Sibugay (Philippine Collective Media Corporation)
100.1 Radyo Agong (DCG Radio-TV Network)
100.9 Brigada News FM (Brigada Mass Media Corporation)
Magic 103.1 (EMedia Productions)

Cable and Satellite TV
Ipil Cable TV
Cignal Digital TV
G Sat Direct TV

Newspapers
Zamboanga Sibugay Tribune 
The Sibugay Express

References

External links

Official Website of the Municipality of Ipil
 [ Philippine Standard Geographic Code]
Philippine Census Information
DILG-Zamboanga Sibugay

Municipalities of Zamboanga Sibugay
Provincial capitals of the Philippines
Establishments by Philippine executive order